Angela Renee Beyincé is an American songwriter and actress. She is also a cousin of American singers Beyoncé and Solange Knowles, and has made songwriting contributions to several of Beyoncé's albums including Dangerously in Love, Destiny Fulfilled, B'Day, and I Am... Sasha Fierce. Beyincé co-wrote the hit song "Naughty Girl", as well as the number one single "Check on It". She once worked as Vice President of Operations at Parkwood Entertainment. Beyincé has also written songs for the Fox television show Star, and in 2020 was cast in the BET comedy-drama series Sistas.

Songwriting credits
Credits are courtesy of Discogs, Tidal, Apple Music, and AllMusic.

Unreleased songs
Credits are courtesy of ASCAP and Genius.
 "Baby Honey Sugar" - Angela Beyincé, Shane Pittman, Kelendria Rowland, Nash Overstreet
 "Best Of Me" - Angela Beyincé, Shane Pittman, Maria Ann Abraham 
 "Endless" - Angela Beyincé, Elizabeth Margaret McAvoy, Shane Stevens
 "Fascination" - Angela Beyincé, Amanda Ghost, Ian Dench, Jack Splash
 "Hello Beautiful" - Angela Beyincé, Autumn Rowe, Erika Nuri, Markus Alandrus Randle
 "Hot Chocolate" - Angela Beyincé, Shane Pittman, Ruslan Odnoralov 
 "I Found Me" - Angela Beyincé, Shane Pittman, James Slater 
 "I'll Be Loving You" - Angela Beyincé, Shane Pittman, Charles Harmon
 "I Wanna Feel Love" - Angela Beyincé, Shane Pittman, Alexander Palmer 
 "I Wonder" - Angela Beyincé, Autumn Rowe, Shane Stevens, Hitesh Coen, Kim Ofstad
 "New Religion" - Angela Beyincé, Gigi Rowe, JC Chasez, Jacob Andrew 
 "Rainbow" - Angela Beyincé, Shane Pittman, James Slater 
 "Something Beautiful" - Angela Beyincé, Shane Pittman, RYKEYZ 
 "Stand Strong For You" - Angela Beyincé, Shane Pittman, James Slater 
 "Throwback" - Angela Beyincé, Autumn Rowe, Shane Stevens, Hitesh Coen, Kim Ofstad
 "Win Or Lose" - Angela Beyincé, Gabriella Laura Caspi, Alissa Hayden Moreno

Filmography

Television

Awards and nominations

References 

American rhythm and blues singer-songwriters
1976 births
Living people
African-American songwriters